The Bugatti Type 51 Dubos Coupe is a one-off automobile originally built by Bugatti in 1931 as an open-top Bugatti Type 51 race car that was driven by legendary racer Louis Chiron, and then modified by Louis Dubos to be a luxury road coupe. It is among the most valuable Bugattis in the world and is considered one of the most beautiful cars ever made.

It is owned and was fully restored by The Nethercutt Collection.

History 

Bugatti chassis No. 51133 was completed in February 1931 as a Bugatti Type 51 race car which was apart of only 40 constructed. Starting off as a Grand Prix race car, No. 51133 was driven by legendary Monacan racer Louis Chiron and won the 1931 French Grand Prix with the vehicle.

After its short but successful racing career the vehicle was sold to French Paris-based businessman Andre Bith, who converted it for legal road use by adding fenders and headlamps. In 1937 Pith contracted Louis Dubos to convert the race car's bodywork to become a luxury coupe. After bodywork was completed, No. 51133 became known as the Bugatti Type 51 Dubos Coupé and was entered into the several French concours d'Elegance competitions, including the 1937 Bagatelle Concours d'Elegance where it was awarded second overall. Pith eventually sold the Dubos, where and the one-off body and chassis were separated and was reverted to its original race car design.

In 1959, American cosmetics entrepreneur J.B. Nethercutt purchased the No. 51133 chassis where it was restored with its Chiron-era grand-prix body. The vehicle remained in the family's car collection on display at the Nethercutt Collection. In 2000 the formerly separated Dubos coupe chassis was for sale at an auction, which Nethercutt purchased and restored No. 51133 to the Dubos Coupe design with a dark purple paint. In 2009 the Dubos was restored again by his son, Jack Nethercutt II and it was repainted in the current deep metallic red.

Under the Nethercutt Collection the Dubos won Best of Show at the prestigious Amelia Island Concours d'Elegance in 2005, Dana Point in 2011, Las Vegas in 2019, and La Jolla in 2022.

In popular culture 
In 2022 the Dubos was featured on the CNBC series Jay Leno's Garage.

Specifications 

Engine Type: Supercharged DOHC

Cylinders: 8

Horsepower: 185

Manufacturer: Bugatti, (Molsheim, France)

Coachbuilder: Louis Dubos Carrosserie, (Paris)

Price When New: $12,000 (165,000 francs)

See also 

 Twenty Grand (Duesenberg)

References 

Vintage vehicles
Nethercutt-Richards family
1930s cars
One-off cars
Bugatti automobiles